Khaled Fahmy is a historian and the Sultan Qaboos Bin Sa'id Professor of Modern Arabic Studies at the University of Cambridge.

Biography 

In 2010, Fahmy returned to Egypt where he was a professor in the Department of History at the American University in Cairo. In 2014-2015 he was an Arcapita Visiting Professor at the Middle East Institute, Columbia University. In 2015-2016 he was the Shawwaf Visiting Professor in Modern Middle East History at Harvard University.

Publications 
Fahmy's dissertation on the social history of the army of Mehmed Ali Pasha was later published by Cambridge University Press under the title All the Pasha's Men: Mehmed Ali: His Army and the Making of Modern Egypt. An Arabic translation was published by Dar al-Shorouk. This was followed by a Turkish translation published by Bilgi University Press under the title Paşa'nın Adamları:Kavalalı Mehmed Ali Paşa, Ordu ve Modern Mısır.

Fahmy also wrote a biography of Mehmed Ali Pasha that appeared in the Makers of the Muslim World Series published by Oneworld Publications under the title of Mehmed Ali: From Ottoman Governor to Ruler of Egypt. He published a collection of articles in Arabic on the history of law and medicine in nineteenth-century that appeared under the title  " الجسد والحداثة: الطب والقانون في مصر الحديثة] .

References 

21st-century Egyptian historians
Year of birth missing (living people)
Living people